The role of the Ambassador and Permanent Representative of Luxembourg to the United Nations is as the leader of the Luxembourger delegation to the United Nations in New York and as head of the Permanent Mission of Luxembourg to the UN. The position has the rank and status of an Ambassador Extraordinary and Plenipotentiary and is also the representative of Luxembourg in the United Nations Security Council (2013-2014).

The Permanent Representative, currently Olivier Maes, is charged with representing Luxembourg, both through its non-permanent seat on the U.N. Security Council and also during plenary meetings of the General Assembly, except in the rare situation in which a more senior officer (such as the Minister for Foreign Affairs or the Prime Minister) is present.

Office holders

See also
Luxembourg and the United Nations
Foreign relations of Luxembourg

References

External links
Permanent Mission of Luxembourg to the United Nations

Foreign relations of Luxembourg
Permanent Representatives of Luxembourg to the United Nations
Luxembourg
Lists of ambassadors of Luxembourg